Czech Open is a name given to many sports events in the Czech Republic, including:

Czech International, a badminton tournament formerly known as the Czech Open
Czech Open (darts), a BDO sanctioned darts tournament
Czech Open (floorball), a floorball tournament
Czech Open (golf), a European Tour golf tournament
Czech Open (tennis), an ATP Challenger Tour tennis tournament
I.ČLTK Prague Open, a WTA International Tournaments tennis tournament